The McClelland Irish Library is a Library situated in and owned by the city of Phoenix, Arizona holding a collection of works related to Celtic culture and genealogy. The building housing the library cost $5 million to build and is modeled after a Norman castle. The library holds over 6,000 books about Irish culture and a collection of genealogy resources, and operates in conjunction with Phoenix Public Library.

See also 
 History of Ireland

References

External links 
 McClelland Irish Library website
 Irish Cultural Center website

Museums in Phoenix, Arizona
Gaelic culture